Linguistic Realities: An Autonomist Metatheory for the Generative Enterprise is a book on philosophy of linguistics by Philip Carr in which the author tries to answer the question: 'Can we reasonably speak of linguistic realities?'

Reception
The book was reviewed by Wayne Cowart and Rudolf P. Botha.

References

External links
Linguistic Realities: An Autonomist Metatheory for the Generative Enterprise

1990 non-fiction books
Cambridge University Press books
Generative linguistics
Books about philosophy of linguistics
Linguistics books
Theses